This article refers to crime in the U.S. state of Oregon.

Crime statistics (1960–2009)

Reported cases of crime in the state of Oregon between 1960 and 2009:

Capital punishment laws 

The Oregon Constitution originally had no provision for a death penalty. A statute was enacted in 1864 allowing for the death penalty in cases of first degree murder. Authority to conduct executions was initially granted to local sheriffs, but in 1903, the Oregon Legislative Assembly passed a law requiring all executions to be conducted at the Oregon State Penitentiary in Salem, the first state prison in Oregon which opened in 1866.

Oregon voters amended the Constitution in 1914 to repeal the death penalty, with 50.04% of the vote. The repeal was an initiative of Governor Oswald West. The death penalty was restored, again by constitutional amendment, in 1920.

Initially, all executions were performed by hanging; lethal gas was adopted as the method after 1931.

Voters outlawed the death penalty in the general election of 1964, with 60% of the vote. Governor Mark Hatfield commuted the sentences of three death row inmates two days later.

Notable cases

Criminals

Crimes

References

 
Crimes in Oregon
History of Oregon